Pablo Agustín González Ferrón (born July 3, 1995)  is a Uruguayan professional footballer, currently, free agent.

Club career
González started his career playing with River Plate. He made his professional debut during the 2015/16 season.

References

1995 births
Living people
Uruguayan footballers
Club Atlético River Plate (Montevideo) players
Villa Española players
Juventud de Las Piedras players
C.A. Bella Vista players
Uruguayan Primera División players
Uruguayan Segunda División players
Association football midfielders